The Budweiser NHL Man of the Year Award was sponsored by Anheuser-Busch to award a National Hockey League player based on his sportsmanship and involvement with charitable groups.  Every NHL team nominates a player and the winner would be chosen by a panel of judges at the start of the Stanley Cup playoffs and receive $21,000 to donate to their charities. The award lasted from the 1987–88 season until the 1991–92 season.  Six years later, the NHL established the NHL Foundation Player Award, which served a similar function until it was merged into the King Clancy Memorial Trophy in 2017–18.

Winners

References

National Hockey League trophies and awards